Musile di Piave is a town and comune in the Metropolitan City of Venice, Veneto, northern Italy.

Piave River flows through the town.
Musile di Piave was an important town in World War I due to its position near the river. In 1918 it was occupied by the Austrians.

Main sights
 Giardino Botanico della Scuola Media Statale "E.Toti" di Musile di Piave, an arboretum and botanical garden

Cities and towns in Veneto